Fairfield is a city in, and the county seat of, Jefferson County, Iowa. It has a population of 9,416 people, according to the 2020 census.  The median family income is $46,138, with 10% of families below the poverty line.

The city is typical of the American Midwest, being situated amidst rolling farmlands filled with corn, soybean, cattle, and hogs. It became the county seat in 1839 with 110 residents and grew to 650 by 1847. Its library was established in 1853, and it held its first fair in 1854. Early architecture in Fairfield includes work by George Franklin Barber and Barry Byrne, who trained under Frank Lloyd Wright.

History
The area now known as Jefferson County was first settled in 1836, and became Jefferson County in 1839, with the new community of Fairfield as the county seat. The name was suggested by Nancy Bonnifield, one of the settlers, because it aptly described the fair fields of the area. But also author Susan Welty suggests it was a play of words on her own name (bonny field). By 1840, Fairfield had a population of 110 and grew to 650 in 1847. The city was the site of the first and second Iowa State Fairs.

Fairfield's library was established in 1853, and was the first library in the state of Iowa. It was first housed in a rented room off the city square. Fairfield's library became the first Carnegie Library outside of Pennsylvania or Scotland funded by Andrew Carnegie, who donated $40,000 to build the library. The Carnegie building on the corner of Washington and Court streets became the library's home on November 28, 1893. Then in May 1996, the library moved to its present location on West Adams Street. The library has over 220,000 items and received accreditation from the State Library of Iowa in 2009.

The total cost to hold the fair was around $320, and public admission was 25 cents per person. It is estimated that between 7,000 and 10,000 fair goers attended this historical event. Parsons College was founded in 1875. In 1893 the Carnegie Library was completed, the first west of the Mississippi. During the time leading up to the American Civil War, Fairfield was a stopping point for the Underground Railroad. Ultimately, over 1,600 residents of Jefferson County served in the Union Army.

Early architecture in Fairfield includes Victorian houses designed by George Franklin Barber as well a 1915 house designed by Barry Byrne, who trained under Frank Lloyd Wright. A 1930s bank building was designed in the Streamline Moderne style. Commercial and institutional architecture were influenced by the Louden Industries, including the Louden Foundry. Fairfield is the site of the prototype Carnegie library. In 1892 Senator, James F. Wilson met with Andrew Carnegie and secured a grant to build the first community-based library in the U.S. This served as the model for 2,700 libraries worldwide. Parsons College later received a grant to build a Carnegie Library. Fairfield became one of the few cities that had two Carnegie Libraries. The Richardsonian Romanesque work is now operated by Indian Hills Community College as a satellite campus building, as a new library was built in 1996.

Geography
Fairfield's geography is typical of the American Midwest: around the city is rolling farmland specializing in corn, soybeans, cattle and hogs. Running west–east through the city is U.S. Route 34; the city of Burlington is to the east and Ottumwa to the west. Iowa Highway 1 runs from north to south through Fairfield, leading north to Iowa City and south to the Missouri state border.

Demographics

2010 census
As of the census of 2010, there were 9,464 people, 4,201 households, and 2,218 families residing in the city. The racial makeup of the city was 90.3% White, 2.0% African American, 0.2% Native American, 3.9% Asian, 1.4% from other races, and 2.2% from two or more races. Hispanic or Latino of any race were 3.6% of the population.

There were 4,201 households, of which 23.1% had children under the age of 18 living with them, 39.2% were married couples living together, 10.1% had a female householder with no husband present, 3.5% had a male householder with no wife present, and 47.2% were non-families. 39.7% of all households were made up of individuals, and 12.6% had someone living alone who was 65 years of age or older. The average household size was 2.09 and the average family size was 2.76.

The median age in the city was 46 years. 18.3% of residents were under the age of 18; 8.6% were between the ages of 18 and 24; 21.9% were from 25 to 44; 35.3% were from 45 to 64; and 15.9% were 65 years of age or older. The gender makeup of the city was 49.7% male and 50.3% female.

2000 census
As of the census of 2000, there were 9,509 people, 4,063 households, and 2,372 families residing in the city. The racial makeup of the city was 94.35% White, 0.99% African American, 0.16% Native American, 2.53% Asian, 0.03% Pacific Islander, 0.73% from other races, and 1.21% from two or more races. Hispanic or Latino of any race were 2.64% of the population.

There were 4,063 households, out of which 30.0% had children under the age of 18 living with them, 45.2% were married couples living together, 10.1% had a female householder with no husband present, and 41.6% were non-families. 35.9% of all households were made up of individuals, and 12.0% had someone living alone who was 65 years of age or older. The average household size was 2.22 and the average family size was 2.90.

In the city, the population was spread out, with 23.7% under the age of 18, 8.7% from 18 to 24, 23.1% from 25 to 44, 30.9% from 45 to 64, and 13.6% who were 65 years of age or older. The median age was 42 years. For every 100 females, there were 92.7 males. For every 100 females age 18 and over, there were 89.1 males.

The median income for a household in the city was $31,202, and the median income for a family was $46,138. Males had a median income of $34,750 versus $24,830 for females. The per capita income for the city was $19,673. About 10.1% of families and 14.5% of the population were below the poverty line, including 17.7% of those under age 18 and 9.9% of those age 65 or over.

There are 4,437 total housing units in Fairfield, 33.3% were built before 1939, 20.4% between 1940 and 1959, 12.7 between 1960 and 1969, 9.2 between 1970 and 1979, 15.5 between 1980 and 1989, 4.6 between 1990 and 1994, 2.5 between 1995 and 1998, and 1.8 between 1998 and 1999. The median home value in Fairfield is $73,200.

Economy 
According to an article in The New York Times, the city "thrives largely on its abundance of start-up companies". Members of the community have established over 400 businesses in areas such as software, manufacturing, and trading. The Agri-Industrial Products company was founded in 1978 and became one of the nation's largest manufacturers of construction warning barrels and other products made of plastic. The city is also home to Creative Edge, a ceramic tile manufacturer.

In 1990, Iowa Governor Terry Branstad called the city "one of the state's economic superstars". A 1997 report said the city had a significant number of entrepreneur businesses including a tofu company, several software firms, a chimney supplies wholesaler, wholefoods grocery store, an oil brokerage, and a telecommunications company. These new companies were reported in 1999 to have "created up to 1,500 jobs in high tech businesses ranging from telecommunications companies to Internet providers to PC-oriented magazines". Later, the city was dubbed "Silicorn Valley" because of the preponderance of new businesses that were Internet and information based founded by practitioners of the Transcendental Meditation technique.

In the 1990s, Fairfield had an average of $10 million in new construction each year. Some of the construction was in the Maharishi Sthapatya Veda style of architecture and included entrances that face either due east or due north causing some businesses and homeowners to close their south and west facing entrances. Eco friendly subdivisions that border Fairfield and also use the architectural principles of Maharishi Sthapatya Veda include Cypress Villages, a  development north of the city, and Abundance Ecovillage, an off-the-grid community of 14 homes built in three clusters north of Fairfield. The first LEED Platinum home in the state of Iowa was built nearby in the Cypress Villages Subdivision. Cypress Villages applied to the state for incorporation as it could not be annexed into either Fairfield or Maharishi Vedic City. That request was denied until such time as more services could be offered by the community. In addition, nearby Maharishi Vedic City, located two miles (3 km) north of Fairfield, began as a subdivision and incorporated as a city in 2001. The city sponsors an annual Eco-Fair and has more solar energy homes and green building than any other city in Iowa.

In 2003 a report by the National Center for Small Communities selected Fairfield as a recipient of The Grassroots Rural Entrepreneurship Award, saying that the city "has become recognized as one [of] the nation's most entrepreneurial small towns." The report said that Fairfield had created over 2,000 jobs in the previous 15 years and that new construction averages $10 million per year. That same year it received the Community Vitality Center's Entrepreneurial Community of the Year award. According to City officials, Fairfield received investments of over $200 million in venture capital from approximately 1990 to 2004. A 2004 National Public Radio report said that over the past 20 years "TM proponents" had created thousands of jobs and more than 200 businesses.

In 2008, the city was the "home of 40 software development and telecom companies" and according to a 2009 report from the University of Iowa's Community Vitality Center, Fairfield has had more than $250 million invested across 50 different companies since 1990. These companies have included various financial services as well as those in marketing, software and telecom. This has created 3000 local jobs plus "12,000 jobs globally, and nearly $1 billion in new equity".

In 2009 the Fairfield Entrepreneurs Association (FEA) celebrated its 20th year. In 2011, the FEA published the Fairifield Edge magazine that contains profiles of over 40 businesses and organizations and describes the entrepreneurial culture of Fairfield and "asset quilting" to support civic and social entrepreneurship. In 2003, the city began hosting National Rural Entrepreneurial Gatherings, which are now called the FRED Conference (Focus on Rural Entrepreneurial Development). An article in the IEDC Economic Development Journal described Fairfield as a Rural Renaissance City because of its entrepreneurial population.

A 2011 article in The Atlantic reported that newcomers to the town had founded more than 400 new businesses in the fields of marketing, computer programming and manufacturing including 40 telecom and software companies. The city's largest employer was reported to be the national broker/dealer services firm called Cambridge Investment Research, with about 400 local employees.

Arts and culture
Fairfield is home to the Fairfield Arts & Convention Center (FACC), a  building that cost $6 million to build. The complex consists of a 522-seat proscenium theatre, a business pavilion, meeting rooms, executive conference suite, art gallery, commercial kitchen, offices and outdoor plaza. The facility opened on December 7, 2007, with a theater named the Stephen Sondheim Center for the Performing Arts, after the American composer, Stephen Sondheim.
As the first theater named after Sondheim, its opening production included seven Broadway actors connected with Sondheim's plays. In May 2010, the FACC facility became "essentially" city-owned, following a citywide vote.

On the first Friday night of every month, Fairfield hosts the 1st Fridays Art Walk, which attracts more than 2,500 visitors and showcases local and national artists in downtown galleries and occasional live, outdoor music. In 2005, the city's Friday Art Walk was named Iowa's Tourism Event of the Year. In 2006, the city was named one of the "12 Great Places You've Never Heard Of" by Mother Earth News magazine, which cited its notable health spa and high number of restaurants and art galleries. It characterized the city as a "sustainable and cosmopolitan town". In the same year, the Iowa Department of Cultural Affairs designated Fairfield as one of the Iowa Great Places.

In 2009, a concert by The Beach Boys and The Nadas was held on the Fairfield Middle School grounds, as a benefit for the FACC and the city's Green Sustainability Plan. The concert was sponsored by the David Lynch Foundation. This was the 40th, and final performance of The Beach Boys' summer tour of 2009. Fairfield was selected by the Iowa Department of Cultural Affairs to be one of six Iowa Great Places to participate in new program to revitalize the cultural arts in 2010.

Fairfield has been described as an "international center" for Transcendental Meditation; a "national magnet" and "the world's largest training center" for practitioners of the Transcendental Meditation technique. Many of its current residents moved there to participate in the group practice of the TM and TM-Sidhi program inside one of the two Golden Domes built in 1981 and 1982 on the Maharishi International University campus. Locally, TM practitioners are sometimes called "roos", slang for gurus, a term they have appropriated, although they "refer to themselves as meditators". Fairfield natives are sometimes known as "townies". Yogic Flyers living in Fairfield who are not part of the university are said to be members of the "Town Super Radiance" (TSR) community. In 2004, National Public Radio reported that "after 30 years, many in Iowa are comfortable with Fairfield's TM community" and a 2008 article in The Wall Street Journal said "natives lived uneasily with the outsiders...but the election of Mr. Malloy [in 2001]... helped ease those tensions".

Author Jack Forem wrote in 2012 that Fairfield is home to one of the largest synagogues in Iowa and one of the largest Liberal Catholic Churches in the nation. That year Oprah Winfrey visited Fairfield to interview citizens and was given a tour the town. An account of her visit titled "America's Most Unusual Town", was broadcast in March 2012 via the Oprah Winfrey Network.

In 2013 Fairfield was named by Smithsonian Magazine as one of "The 20 Best Small Towns to Visit in 2013" and was visited by actor Jim Carrey, who visited again in 2014. Other celebrity visitors include film director David Lynch, singer-songwriter Donovan, musician Moby, musician James McCartney, psychiatry professor Norman E. Rosenthal, and CNN correspondent Candy Crowley.

Parks and recreation
Fairfield has 12 public parks and recreation areas consisting over 1,300 acres (over 5.5 km2) and a "master trail plan" underway that includes a  trail system. Some of the trail is paved, five miles (8 km) of trail is covered with lime chips while other areas include traditional wooded paths. The trail system connects several areas of interest including the Neff Family Wetlands dike, and the BNSF Trail segment, which crosses a new bridge that joins Walton Lake with Chautauqua Park. The final trail plan includes a "heritage path" leading to historical sites and a water trail that connects the area's river and three lakes. In 2012, Fairfield was selected" as one of ten finalists" in the Blue Zones community, "small city category" primarily because of its "many walking trails and outdoor activities". In 2015 Fairfield was named a certified Blue Zones Community.

Government 

Fairfield is governed by a seven-member city council headed by a mayor. The current mayor, Connie Boyer, was elected in 2019. City council members serve staggered four-year terms. The council consists of one representative from each of the city's five wards, plus two at-large representatives. As of 2020, city council members are Katy Anderson (at large), Doug Flournoy (at large), Martha Rasmussen (Ward 1), Paul Gandy (Ward 2), Judy Ham (Ward 3), Elizabeth Estey (Ward 4), and Tom Twohill (Ward 5). Fairfield's city administrator is Aaron Kooiker.

Sustainability 
Fairfield's grassroots efforts to create a sustainable community that focuses on reducing energy and protecting resources have been supported by a position created by Iowa State University extension services and the City of Fairfield.

In 2009, Mayor Malloy was named by MSN.com to a nationwide list of 15 "green" mayors. Malloy describes the city's agenda for sustainability as aggressive, and includes a Green Strategic Plan covering everything from conservation, local farms, local food, alternative transportation, and bike paths and trails. The hope, according to Malloy, is that Fairfield will become a model community and a "virtual template" for small cities interested in creating a sustainable city environment. In 2009 the city qualified for an $80,000 grant from the state Office of Energy Independence as funding for a sustainability plan scheduled to be completed in 2020. The city was one of 21 locations to receive the state Governor's Environmental Excellence Award in 2013 after it reduced its energy consumption by more than 8% in one year. Fairfield has installed $60,000 worth of solar panels on its public library building and through state and local funding the city has created a $4 million "energy-efficiency loan fund."

Education 
The Fairfield Community School District is home to nearly 2,500 students, teachers, administrators and staff, with two elementary schools (Pence Elementary and Washington Elementary), a middle school, and a 3A high school. The high school has approximately 630 students and 75 staff members. The total cost of the construction was approximately $550,000. In 1984, an addition to the school provided a commons area, new library, new kitchen, a counseling office, and an expansion of the gymnasium. In the 2001–2002 school year, the district added a new transportation building.

In 2010, Lincoln Elementary school was closed due to budget cuts. Also, all fifth grade classes were moved to the Fairfield Middle School. The Fairfield school board voted to use the building for Fairfield High School's alternative school in 2010–11. Fairfield was also home to Fairfield Christian School for a number of years.

Fairfield also has two private schools, Maharishi School (US) and Cornerstone Primary School. The city is home to Maharishi International University (MIU) (formerly Maharishi University of Management [MUM]), a private university that moved to Fairfield in 1974 after purchasing the former campus of Parsons College. Following a national conference held in 1979, about 800 people moved to Fairfield at the urging of MIU's founder.

Media
Radio
Fairfield has several radio stations including KHOE 90.5 FM, KKFD-FM 95.9, and KMCD 1570 AM.
Television
Fairfield's local television station is called FPAC (Fairfield Public Access).
Newspaper
Fairfield's local newspaper is called the Southeast Iowa Union, which serves Fairfield, Washington, and Mt. Pleasant. The Union is a five-time-a-week morning newspaper.

Infrastructure

Transportation 
Fairfield has a small airport north of the city, which was built in 1967 and renovated in 2006. The Fairfield Municipal Airport is a general use, public airport. It offers  of concrete runway. Bus service to Fairfield is provided by Greyhound Lines affiliates Jefferson Lines and Burlington Trailways.

Amtrak carries passengers west–east on the California Zephyr, with passenger stations in Mount Pleasant, (25 miles to the east) and Ottumwa (20 miles to the west). Rail service is by Burlington Northern Santa Fe (BNSF) railway. Locomotives no longer sound their horns within city limits after the city established a railroad Quiet Zone in 2012.

The Rock Island Line also passed through Fairfield, but closed in the late 1970s. The old steel trestle has been removed from its crossing, and the walking trail that circumnavigates the city uses part of the old roadbed.

Evidence of other long-forgotten rail lines can be found in the woods around the city. A section of narrow gauge roadbed can be found cutting its way through Whitham Woods, a park on Fairfield's western edge.

Notable people 

Richard Beymer, actor, resident of Fairfield
Buddy Biancalana, former Major League Baseball player, resident of Fairfield
Greg Brown, folk musician, born in Fairfield
Fannie Brown Patrick, musician and civic leader 
Ben Carter, American actor, born in Fairfield
Flavia Colgan, political contributor on MSNBC, attended Fairfield High School
Joe Crail, former member of the United States House of Representatives for California, born in Fairfield
Walter Day, founder of Twin Galaxies, resident of Fairfield
Dave Despain, sportscaster, born in Fairfield
Djemba Djemba, multi-platinum record producer, raised in Fairfield
Ben Foster, actor, raised in Fairfield
Jon Foster, actor, former resident of Fairfield
John Hagelin, quantum physicist, three-time United States Presidential candidate, resident of Fairfield
Milo Hamilton, baseball announcer, born in Fairfield
Harry Harlow, psychologist, born in Fairfield 
Bernhart Henn, U.S. Congressman, early resident of Fairfield
Claire Hoffman, journalist, attended school in Fairfield
Michigan Jake, bass singer, Greg Hollander born in Fairfield. World Champion, Vocal Group Hall of Fame 2001
John Jackson, gold and bronze medal winner at the 1912 Summer Olympics, resident of Fairfield
Rebecca J. Keck, 19th century female physician and patent medicine entrepreneur, born in Fairfield 
Orpha Klinker, artist known for her plein air paintings landscapes
Hugh J. Knerr, major general in the United States Air Force, born in Farifield
Bob Krause, Iowa state representative, resident of Fairfield
Richard L. Lawson, four-star general, born in Fairfield
Pamela Levy, painter, born in Fairfield
Eli Lieb, independent singer-songwriter, originally from Fairfield
Moses A. McCoid, U.S. Representative from Iowa, studied law in Fairfield
David Rosenboom, composer, born in Fairfield
Mary Ruthsdotter, feminist activist, born in Fairfield
Chad Setterstrom, former National Football League player, resident of Fairfield
Max Steinberg, professional poker player, born in Fairfield
Matt Stutzman, silver medal winner in archery at the 2012 Summer Paralympics, holder of the world record for the longest, most accurate shot in archery
Hays B. White, Kansas state politician and lawmaker, born near Fairfield
James F. Wilson, former United States Senator, resided in Fairfield
Mehitable E. Woods (1813–1891), hero of the American Civil War
Nick Webster, former British professional soccer player for Wyre Villa, resides in Fairfield

References

External links

 City of Fairfield
 Fairfield Chamber of Commerce

 
Cities in Iowa
Cities in Jefferson County, Iowa
County seats in Iowa
Transcendental Meditation
Populated places on the Underground Railroad
Underground Railroad in Iowa
1839 establishments in Iowa Territory